Kikulwe Mawuba was Kabaka of the Kingdom of Buganda between 1736 and 1738. He was the twenty first (21st) Kabaka of Buganda.

Claim to the throne
He was the fourth (4th) son of Kabaka Ndawula Nsobya, the nineteenth (19th) Kabaka of Buganda. His mother was Nakikulwe Namirembe, the third (3rd) of his father's seven (7) wives. He ascended the throne after the death of his elder brother, Kabaka Kagulu Tebukywereke. He established his capital at Kibibi.

Married Life
He is reported to have married five (5) wives:

 Nabiddo, daughter of Luba, of the Nyonyi clan
 Najjuka, daughter of Gunju, of the Butiko clan
 Nakabugo, daughter of Mugema, of the Nkima clan
 Namatovu, daughter of Kajubi, of the Nsenene clan
 Naabakyaala Nantume Nanzigu, daughter of Sekayiba, of the Mbogo clan

Issue
He is recorded to have fathered at least nine children:

 Prince (Omulangira) Madangu, whose mother was Nakabugo
 Prince (Omulangira) Mpalikitenda, whose mother was Nabiddo
 Prince (Omulangira) Maganda, whose mother was Nakabugo
 Prince (Omulangira) Gabanga, whose mother was Nakabugo
 Prince (Omulangira) Segaamweenge, whose mother was Nakabugo
 Princess (Omumbejja) Zansanze, whose mother was Nakabugo
 Princess (Omumbejja) Nabaloga, whose mother was Nakabugo
 Prince (Omulangira) Gabane, whose mother was Namatovu
 Prince (Omulangira) Gomottoka, whose mother was Namatovu

The final years
Kabaka Kikulwe was murdered by his elder half-brother, Prince Mawanda Sebanakitta, who seized the throne around 1738. Ssekabaka Kikulwe is buried at Kaliiti, Busiro.

Succession table

See also
 Kabaka of Buganda

References

External links
List of the Kings of Buganda

Kabakas of Buganda
18th-century monarchs in Africa